The 1959 San Diego F3H crash was the crash of a United States Navy McDonnell F3H-2N Demon in San Diego, California, on 4 December 1959. The pilot, Ensign Albert Joseph Hickman from VF-121, chose not to eject from the stricken aircraft, piloting it away from populated areas of Clairemont, including an elementary school, saving "as many as 700 people" according to one estimate on the ground. He even opened his window, and shouted on the kids that were playing on the playground to go away.  The aircraft crashed into a canyon, with the pilot being the sole fatality. Hickman has been memorialized in the naming of an elementary school and a sports complex in San Diego. Several decades later, a similar crash occurred in University City, a neighborhood north of Clairemont.

Background

Pilot
Albert Joseph Hickman was born in Sioux City, Iowa, on April 4, 1938. Later he graduated from Central High School in 1956, enlisting in the Navy before graduating. Hickman was a naval aviator, being assigned to VF-121, a training squadron at Naval Air Station Miramar.

Crash district
Miramar was previously part of a rancho controlled by Mission San Diego de Alcalá, before becoming Camp Kearny, a Naval Auxiliary Air Field, and then Miramar Naval Air Station. Another part of the rancho controlled by Mission San Diego de Alcalá would become the current neighborhood of Clairemont; previously cattle grazing land, it was developed in the 1950s into one of the United States' largest postwar planned tract house suburban communities. Part of the neighborhood of Clairemont is within the airport traffic area of Miramar.

Crash
On 4 December 1959, Hickman was practicing carrier landings. As he returned to Miramar in his McDonnell F3H-2N Demon, the aircraft's engine failed. The aircraft was at an altitude of  when the engine compressor stalled and surged. It was reported that Hickman chose not to eject from the stricken aircraft and even opened the aircraft canopy and waved to warn children of his aircraft, all the while steering it away from Hawthorne Elementary School in Clairemont, just missing the school's fence. Hickman  was the sole fatality.

Aftermath
An estimate claims that as many as 700 lives were saved when Hickman steered the aircraft during its crash. For his actions that led to his death, Hickman was posthumously awarded the Navy and Marine Corps Medal. He is buried at Memorial Park Cemetery in Sioux City. The location of the crash site is on Diane Avenue in Clairemont, with no remnants remaining at the site.

Hickman has been memorialized in several ways; in 1962, an American Legion post in Kearny Mesa was dedicated to Hickman. In 1971, an elementary school in the Mira Mesa neighborhood was named after Hickman; its construction was completed in 1976. In 1994, on land leased from the US Navy, a sports complex was also dedicated in honor of Hickman.

Several decades later, a similar event as the crash in 1959 occurred during the 2008 San Diego F/A-18 crash. On 8 December, a United States Marine Corps two-seat F/A-18D had engine problems after taking off from the  during training. Instead of landing at Naval Air Station North Island, Lieutenant Dan Neubauer flew the ailing aircraft to Miramar. Neubauer and the aircraft were part of Marine Fighter Attack Training Squadron 101 based at Miramar. On its way to Miramar, both of the aircraft's engines failed. Neubauer decided to eject from the aircraft, which was seconds from crashing. Neubauer ejected safely, landing east of University City High School; he was later cleared to fly again. This crash was compared to the 1959 crash.

In 2019, a commemorative plaque for Hickman was added to the Mt. Soledad National Veterans Memorial.

See also

List of accidents and incidents involving military aircraft (1955–1959)

Notes

References

External links

 

1959 in California
Accidents and incidents involving United States Navy and Marine Corps aircraft
Aviation accidents and incidents in California
Aviation accidents and incidents in the United States in 1959
Clairemont, San Diego
December 1959 events in the United States
1950s in San Diego
United States Navy in the 20th century